Venus Temple is a 6,281-foot-elevation summit located in the eastern Grand Canyon, in Coconino County of northern Arizona, US. The landform is attached to Apollo Temple immediately south-southeast. Venus Temple is ~2.0 mi northwest of the southwest-flowing Colorado River. Both Venus and Apollo Temples are 4.0 mi west of the south end of the Grand Canyon’s East Rim. The east side of Venus Temple drains into Upper Basalt Canyon and Creek; the west side drains west-then-south into Lower Unkar Creek. The prominence of Venus Temple is composed of lower members of the orange-red Supai Group on the upper platform of the cliff-forming Redwall Limestone, upon the Cambrian Tonto Group. Members of the Grand Canyon Supergroup lie below.

See also
 Geology of the Grand Canyon area
 Juno Temple (Grand Canyon)

References

External links
 Aerial view, Venus Temple, Mountainzone

Grand Canyon
Landforms of Coconino County, Arizona